The Mazda Parkway is a minibus that was based on the Mazda Titan platform, and was manufactured at the Hiroshima Factory exclusively for the Japanese market. In 1974, the Parkway was installed with the 13B rotary engine and well as a 2000cc gasoline type "VA" and the diesel 2500cc type "XA". It also offered a novel transmission approach added to the manual transmission installed, called a sub transmission to cope with the load carrying requirements, and a fluid coupling to preventing engine stalling, knocking and oscillation. It was introduced July 22, 1974 and the rotary engine was replaced with a more conventional diesel engine in 1977.

There were two generations of the Parkway, from 1972 to 1982, and the type WVL from 1982 until 1997. It replaced the Mazda Light Bus that was previously built from 1964 until 1972. It was also available as the Kia Combi due to Mazda's partnership.

The Parkway was a favorite with public transportation in southern Japan, such as Hiroshima and Hamamatsu in Shizuoka Prefecture, and competed with the Toyota Coaster, Nissan Civilian, Isuzu Journey, and Mitsubishi Fuso Rosa.

Mazda Light Bus

References

Vehicles introduced in 1972
Parkway
Minibuses
Cars powered by Wankel engines